The African Qualifiers for the 1968 Summer Olympics football tournament began in April 1967 and ended in June 1968.

Group 1

First round

|}

Libya advance.

Guinea advance.

Second round

|}

United Arab Republic withdrew. Guinea advance.

Algeria advance.

Final

|}

Guinea qualified for the 1968 Summer Olympics.

Group 2

First round

|}

Uganda withdrew; Nigeria advance.

Madagascar advance.

Second round

|}

Nigeria advance by lot.

Ethiopia advance.

Final

|}

Nigeria qualified for the 1968 Summer Olympics.

Group 3

First round

|}

Mali withdrew; Cameroon advance.

Second round

|}

Morocco advance by lot.

Cameroon advance by lot but withdrew; Ghana advance.

Final

|}

Morocco qualified, but withdrew after refusing to play against Israel in the 1968 Summer Olympics final tournament in Group C. Ghana replaced Morocco.

References 

Football qualification for the 1968 Summer Olympics
Football at the Summer Olympics – Men's African Qualifiers